Kung Tayo'y Magkakalayo (International title: If We Were To Be Apart / ) is a 2010 Philippine romantic-drama television series directed by Erick C. Salud, Trina N. Dayrit and Dondon S. Santos. The series features an ensemble cast consisting of Kris Aquino, Gabby Concepcion, Albert Martinez, Gina Pareño, Jaclyn Jose, Maricar Reyes, Gerald Anderson, Coco Martin, Max Eigenmann, Jessy Mendiola and Kim Chiu. The series premiered on ABS-CBN's Primetime Bida nighttime block from January 18 to July 9, 2010, replacing  Dahil May Isang Ikaw and was replaced Noah.

It is also part of the 60th Year of Pinoy Soap Opera Celebration.

Synopsis

Celine is trapped in an unhappy marriage with Frank. One day, Celine was shocked to hear that Frank's plane crashed. While grieving the loss of her husband, she also discovered that Frank had an affair with Astrud and they had a love child named Ringo. Steve from NBI, was the investigator assigned to Frank's case. Later on, they became friends and fell for each other. They had an affair that nobody knew except Barry, Celine's best friend.

Eight months later, Frank was found alive. Celine walked away from her relationship with Steve for the sake of her marriage to Frank. However, she found out that she got pregnant by Steve. For the sake of her family, she told Frank that he is the father of her daughter, Gwen. From then on, Celine vows to be loyal to her family.

After nearly eighteen years, Celine is reunited with Steve. She learns that Steve is married to Selina. Celine realizes that she still loves Steve, but she knows that they are no longer meant to be. To make things more complicated, Gwen, who has grown into a pretty young lady, meets Robbie, the younger brother of Selina. Gwen and Robbie begin as enemies, but later fall in love.

Cast and characters

Main cast
 Kris Aquino as Celine De Jesus-Crisanto – A perfectionist and domineering mother who was taken care of by a religious and kind grandmother. Celine does everything to become a good wife and tries to give her husband Frank a child but unaware that she is too strict to Gwen. Celine is harsh and jealous at Astrud and still secretly doesn't accept Ringo in her family. She finds out after her husband Frank is in an airplane crash she finds out that he has a child which hurts her. She falls for Steve but as she falls deeply and passionately, she is informed by Steve about Frank's appearance and how he is recently alive which makes her in dismay and what's worse she loses Steve and she has a child with Frank, but later finds out that it is her child with Steve.
 Kim Chiu as Gwen Marie Crisanto Sebastian-Castillo – Celine's rebellious teenage daughter with Steve and wife of Robbie Castillo. She hates her mother because Celine always wants perfection, but was spoiled by her father and Astrud. She will realize that throughout her rebelliousness the truth behind her family problems in fact, her mother's struggle to keep a secret, her father Frank being part of a syndicate and not truly her father by blood and how she must also help her family not to fall apart.
 Gerald Anderson as Robbie Castillo - Lost his parents at a very young age; was saved and raised by Steve. Robbie is protective of his elder sister Selina, who married Steve. He dropped out of the PNP Academy a year before graduating, he currently works at NBI with Steve. Husband of Gwen, and is determined to do everything for Gwen, he and his older sister Selina are the only two left but Selina dies at the half final weeks of the story. He demands justice for what has happened and convicts Ringo as he is enthralled in these family problems.
 Gabby Concepcion as Steve Sebastian – The biological father of Gwen. He saves Robbie as a child and takes him under his wing. Steve falls in love and marries Selina, Robbie's elder sister. He is an NBI agent who is dedicated to saving lives, but he still regrets not having saved his own (first) wife and their unborn child from death while she was working overseas.
 Albert Martinez as Francisco "Frank" Crisanto† (RX Gang code name: "Uno") series' main antagonist - Celine's airline pilot husband who was thought of as dead after a plane crash, but turns out to be alive after several months. He has a son, Ringo, with his co-worker, Astrud; due to an accident, he and Astrud become partners in crime in the latter parts in the story. He dies after being shot by his father Rustico Crisanto/Supremo.
 Coco Martin as Ringo Quijano Crisanto† series' main antagonist - Frank's out-of-wedlock son to Astrud, and with whom Gwen is raised as her brother. He is rebellious and believes he is abnormal because of his mental illness (bipolar disorder). Ringo looks up to his father and respects him so much that he gets himself (and his sister) in trouble following his wishes but he will dig deeper to the secrets his mother and father have kept. He is the one who witnessed Selina's death that leads him into Rustico's/Supremo's syndicate. He was shot and killed by Robbie.
 Gina Pareño as Petulah "Pet" Crisanto - Frank's overprotective mother. She loves Frank so much that she will do anything for him. She corrects every mistake Celine, Frank, or Gwen does. After becoming a widow, she raised Frank alone and did everything to give the best of everything to her son. Now that Frank has his own family, she still lives with them and gets in between their family affairs she will reveal truth as she sees her unknown husband alive and what secrets lurk around her and some that confront her.
 Jaclyn Jose as Astrud Quijano-Crisanto† series' main female antagonist - "As The Villain Killer Influence" - Co-worker of Frank, with whom she has a son, Ringo, due to an affair. She spoils Gwen so that Gwen would love her more as a mother and because she can't take Frank away from Celine. She becomes the most controversial antagonist as she will do anything for money her family and will give her son all of those things. She was shot by Celine and dies afterwards.
 Maricar Reyes as Selina Castillo-Sebastian† – Elder sister of Robbie. She and her brother lost their parents after they got shot. She worked abroad but came to find her parents dead. She lived in with Steve and decided to raise Robbie so he didn't feel as if not having a mother or father. She marries Steve as Robbie grows up as an adult, but finds out that she cannot produce a baby. Just when she was about to adopt a baby with her husband, Steve, she got kidnapped and shot. She dies but became part of the problems Celine faced being an employee, a friend, a sister, and a good in-law.
 Max Eigenmann as Anna Alicia Magdalena – She was the neighbor who lived beside Steve, Robbie and Selina's house. She was working too at an orphanage before she attended PNPA. As she attended the PNPA with Robbie, with whom she falls in unrequited love, but their relationship remains platonic. Left the PNPA a year before graduating, she currently works at NBI with Robbie and Steve.
 Jessy Mendiola as Cristina Angeles – She and Ringo meet at an aeronautics school and fall in love. Her dad (Mark Gil) is not supportive of their relationship, yet they continue their relationship in secret. Her father's family wants to move him for physical rehabilitation in the US, after a hit-and-run accident, so they are threatened by an imminent long-distance separation.

Supporting cast
 Gaby Dela Merced as Alina
 Bing Davao as Matt Cordero
 Thara Jordana as Kelly
 Reynold "Pooh" Garcia as Barry
 Paolo Serrano as Angelo, NBI Agent
 Nikki Valdez as Colby
 Erika Padilla as Diane
 Hiyasmin Neri as Brittany
 Ronaldo Valdez as Supremo†/Rustico Crisanto†
 Miriam Quiambao as Aludra
 Jhong Hilario as Jason† (RX Gang/Una Vita codename) / Agustin†
 Francine Prieto as Olivia Smith
 Tibo Jumalon as Roy Corpuz

Special participation
 Gloria Romero as Barbara De Jesus†
 James "Bimby" Aquino-Yap as Michael De Jesus Crisanto 
 Angel Jacob as Gladys Sebastian†
 Janice Huang as Asha
 Menggie Cobarrubias as Astrud's medical doctor†
 Fred Payawan as Borg
 Bam Romana as Tonzy
 Wendy Valdez as Laura
 Marlon Mance as Dante, Laura's husband
 John James Uy as Mark
 Cassandra Ponti as Vega
 Gee-Ann Abraham as Aliya

Cameo appearances
 Phebe Khae Arbotante  as young Gwen
 Yogo Singh as Robbie (5 years old)
 Empress Schuck as young Celine
 Sharlene San Pedro as young Selina
 Joseph Bitangcol as young Steve
 Nikki Bacolod as young Astrud
 Izzy Canillo as young Ringo
 Paul Salas as young Frank (10 years old)
 Elijah Magundayao as Ringo (8 years old)
 Christian Vasquez as young Rustico Crisanto/Supremo
 Gilleth Sandico as young Petulah
 Kristel Fulgar as young Aludra
 Angel Sy as young Alina
 Celine Lim as young Asha

Production
On November 25, 2009, ABS-CBN released a teaser via their official YouTube account identifying the cast and characters. On December 27, 2009, ABS-CBN released its first full trailer during The Buzz showing its release date, January 18, 2010.

Launch
Kung Tayo'y Magkakalayo was launched as one of the ABS-CBN offering for the 60th celebration of Filipino Soap Opera  during the ABS-CBN Trade Launch for the first quarter of 2010, entitled "Bagong Simula" (New Beginning).

Theme song
For the third time, Gary Valenciano sang the theme song for a series which stars Kim Chiu and Gerald Anderson. The other two were Tayong Dalawa and Sana Maulit Muli. The title of the series was derived from the song, "Kung Tayo'y Magkakalayo", which was originally sung by Rey Valera and covered by Gary Valenciano for the show. Other songs featured on the show are "Lapit" by Yeng Constantino  and "Pagka't Mahal Kita" by Bugoy Drilon.

Leave 
Kris Aquino left for half a month due to political reasons for her brother Noynoy Aquino as president. The show was to be extended until August, but due to taping reasons the show did not go through with its 8th month run as planned.

Production crew
 Associate Producers: Marissa Kalaw, Jhanice Casallo
 Production Assistants: Alma Cagalingan, Dianne Combalicer, Emerald Silvestre
 Locations: Analiza Anastacio, James Aquino, Lenlen Gatus, Edna Mendoza, Kremlin Bandiola, Halston Milanbilen, Luis Loberes
 Field Cashiers: Girlie Esguerra, Arvie Delos Reyes
 Art Directors: Rizza Fernandez, Agnes Lapdis
 Assistant Directors: Vincent Gaite, LA Madridejos
 Backpack Director: Avel Sunpongco
 Musical Directors: Jessie Lasaten Carmina Cuya
 Production Designer: Nancy Arcega
 Sound Engineer: Abet Casasas
 Lighting Directors: Alfredo Hernando, Ferdie Marquez and David Siat
 Master Editings: Jesus Mendoza Jr. and Ray-an Ludwig Peralta
 Director of Photography: Romy Vitug
 Story and Screenplay: Arlene Tamayo
 Executive Producer: Emerald C. Suarez
 Writers:Honey Hidalgo
 Production Manager: Dagang Vilbar
 Executive In Charge Of Creative: Rondel P. Lindayag
 Executive In Charge Of Production: Roldeo T. Endrinal
 Directions: Dondon S. Santos, Trina N. Dayrit and Erick C. Salud

Reception

Ratings 
The show premiered with a 34.4% household rating in the GMA Network-dominated Mega Manila Area. The show on ABS-CBN beat its rival program The Last Prince (31.7%) on GMA Network. The show was the #1 primetime series for the night, ranked second overall, behind GMA's newscast, 24 Oras at 35.7% in the Mega Manila TV Ratings based on AGB Nielsen Mega Manila data. The finale episode posted an impressive 14.5 people rating (not household rating) in the Mega Manila ratings beating its rival program (Endless Love) on GMA Network which posted a competitive 14.4 people rating. The show ranked #1 for the night in Mega Manila. ABS-CBN's Agua Bendita  tied with GMA's Endless Love with 14.4 people rating each.

Based on the Kantar Media/TNS Nationwide TV Ratings, the pilot episode of posted an impressive 36.4% household rating while the finale episode mustered a whopping 42.7% beating its lead-in program, Agua Bendita (42.1%). Both of these programs were both known to be the aces (the two strongest shows) of ABS-CBN's primetime line-up as ABS-CBN was also known to be the dominant TV network in the nationwide ratings.

Awards

See also
List of programs broadcast by ABS-CBN
List of shows previously aired by ABS-CBN

References

External links
 Kung Tayo'y Magkakalayo free episodes on-demand at TFCNow
 

ABS-CBN drama series
Television series by Dreamscape Entertainment Television
2010 Philippine television series debuts
2010 Philippine television series endings
Philippine action television series
Philippine romance television series
Filipino-language television shows
Television shows set in the Philippines